Schaack is a surname. Notable people with the surname include:

Joseph Schaack (born 1945), Luxembourgian politician
Roland Schaack (born 1973), Luxembourgian footballer and manager
Sarah Schaack, evolutionary geneticist

See also
Peter van Schaack (1747–1832), American lawyer
Schack